Brett Gotcher is an American long distance runner.

Gotcher ran for Aptos High School and Stanford University.

At the 2009 IAAF World Half Marathon Championships Gotcher finished 64th.

At the 2009 IAAF World Cross Country Championships Gotcher finished 75th.

He made his marathon debut in 2010.

References 

Living people
American male long-distance runners
Place of birth missing (living people)
1984 births
American male marathon runners
American male cross country runners